Back on My Feet (BoMF) is a national non-profit organization focused on helping homeless people gain independence, living skills, and connect them with essential community resources, ultimately leading them to sustainable employment and stable housing. The organization's program is focused primarily on physical exercise, specifically early morning runs.

The organization was founded in Philadelphia, Pennsylvania, United States in 2007 and as of October 2019 has chapters in 13 US cities. Back on My Feet is privately funded and its 2019 operating budget is $7.5 million.

History 
Back on My Feet started at 5 a.m. in late June 2007. Every morning, founder and avid runner Anne Mahlum waved hello and ran past a group of homeless men. In a few weeks, Mahlum decided to contact Sunday Breakfast Rescue Mission, the homeless shelter where these men were living, and ask Executive Director Richard McMillen if she could invite the men to join her on her runs. He agreed, and the first run took place on Wednesday, July 3, 2007 with a group of nine individuals ages 28–57, who were hoping to move their lives forward both physically and spiritually through running.

Program and impact 
Operating in 13 major cities, Back on My Feet uses running and community along with essential housing and workforce development resources to help individuals currently experiencing homelessness obtain sustainable employment and stable housing.

The Back on My Feet program begins with recruitment at transitional homeless and residential facilities as well as addiction and treatment facilities in those 13 cities across the US. Participants in the program (referred to as "members") commit to run 3 times a week, early in the morning.  Following 30 days, if a member has achieved 90% attendance, they move on to the organization's Next Steps program.

In Next Steps, members work one-on-one with BoMF program staff to develop a personal road map to independence. Each member attends financial literacy classes and job skills training provided through partnerships with its corporate partners. Members can earn financial assistance to remove barriers to employment and housing such as work supplies, transportation and security deposits. Members who achieve employment and housing become alumni members. Within six months of becoming a Back on My Feet alumnus, 90% of members maintain their employment, 60% receive a wage increase and 20% achieve a promotion.

References

External links
http://www.facebook.com/pages/Back-on-My-Feet/107732092609943 Official Facebook

Non-profit organizations based in Philadelphia
Running in the United States
Homelessness in the United States